The first San Remo Grand Prix was a non-championship event, held on July 25, 1937, for 1500 cc Voiturette class Grand Prix cars and ran counter clockwise on a 1.862 km (1.157 m.) street circuit in the town of San Remo, known as the San Remo Circuit (Circuito di San Remo, official name: Circuita Stracittadino di San Remo)

The race was run in three 25 lap heats, the 2 best of each heat qualifying for the 30 lap (55.860 km.) final, which was won in 34'39" min. by Achille Varzi driving a Maserati 4CM, averaging 96.7 km/h.

Heat 1

Heat 2

Heat 3

Final Classification

References

External links
San Remo Grand Prix Ospedaletti Circuit blog
1937 San Remo Circuit Grand Prix Golden Years
San Remo Circuits (1937-1951) on Google Maps

San Remo Grand Prix
San Remo Grand Prix
Grand Prix race reports
1937 in Italian motorsport